The men's 50 metre rifle three positions event was a shooting sports event held as part of the shooting programme of the 1956 Summer Olympics. It was the second appearance of the event. The competition was held on 4 December 1956 at the shooting ranges in Melbourne. 44 shooters from 27 nations competed.

Results

References

Shooting at the 1956 Summer Olympics
Men's 050m 3 positions 1956